Kafr Kamra (also spelled Kfar Kamrah) is a village in northern Syria, administratively part of the Hama Governorate, located west of Hama. Nearby localities include Awj to the north, Aqrab and Qarmas to the northeast, Houla to the east, Maryamin to the southeast, Akakir and Kafr Ram, Ayn Halaqim to the west and Nisaf to the northwest. According to the Syria Central Bureau of Statistics, Kafr Kamra had a population of 2,895 in the 2004 census. Its inhabitants are predominantly Alawites.

References

Bibliography

 

Populated places in Masyaf District
Alawite communities in Syria